Borbála Tóth Harsányi (born 8 August 1946 in Debrecen) is a former Hungarian handball and Olympic medalist

She has a younger sister, Katalin Tóth Harsányi, who was also a Hungarian international handball player.

Awards
 Nemzeti Bajnokság I Top Scorer: 1970

References

External links
Profile on Database Olympics

1946 births
Living people
Sportspeople from Debrecen
Hungarian female handball players
Handball players at the 1976 Summer Olympics
Olympic handball players of Hungary
Olympic bronze medalists for Hungary
Olympic medalists in handball
Medalists at the 1976 Summer Olympics